Timothy Wm. Alexander Hamulack (born November 14, 1976) is an American former professional baseball pitcher. Hamulack is 6' 4" and weighs 220 pounds. He throws left-handed.

Professional career
He was drafted in the 32nd round of the 1995 Major League Baseball draft by the Houston Astros out of Edgewood, Maryland High School, and he pitched within their system from –, at which point he left as a minor league free agent to join the Boston Red Sox organization. There he posted an ERA of 3.52 at Double-A Portland and 6.98 with Triple-A Pawtucket. Boston let him walk after the  minor league campaign, at which point he signed on with the New York Mets as a minor league free agent.

He made his big-league debut on September 2, 2005, when the Mets played the Florida Marlins. He pitched in six games in 2005 and posted an ERA of 23.14.

On January 4, 2006, Hamulack found himself a part of his fourth organization in four years, as he was dealt from the Mets to the Los Angeles Dodgers along with Jae Weong Seo in exchange for relievers Steve Schmoll and Duaner Sánchez.

On January 17, 2008, he signed a minor league deal with the Kansas City Royals. He pitched at Double-A Northwest Arkansas in 2008.

He pitched in the Atlantic League of Professional Baseball in 2009 and 2010 with the Lancaster Barnstormers. On March 4, 2011, he signed another contract with the Barnstormers. Hamulack was their closer in 2010 and again in 2011.

Hamulack signed a minor league contract with the Cincinnati Reds on June 1, 2011.

References

External links

1976 births
Living people
Major League Baseball pitchers
Los Angeles Dodgers players
Baseball players from New York (state)
New York Mets players
Sportspeople from Ithaca, New York
Gulf Coast Astros players
Quad Cities River Bandits players
Michigan Battle Cats players
Kissimmee Cobras players
Montgomery Raptors baseball players
Brevard County Manatees players
Portland Sea Dogs players
Pawtucket Red Sox players
San Antonio Missions players
Tacoma Rainiers players
Norfolk Tides players
Las Vegas 51s players
Binghamton Mets players
Arizona League Royals players
Northwest Arkansas Naturals players
Omaha Royals players
Lancaster Barnstormers players
Carolina Mudcats players